Batts Nest or Batt's Nest was an unincorporated community in Winston County, Alabama, United States.  It is now a ghost town.

References

Ghost towns in Alabama
Populated places in Winston County, Alabama